Defeated Creek is a stream in Smith County, Tennessee, in the United States.

Defeated Creek is a tributary to Cordell Hull Lake, where a marina is located.

See also
List of rivers of Tennessee

References

Rivers of Smith County, Tennessee
Rivers of Tennessee